Kim Jwa-geun (1797 – 5 June 1869) was a Korean political figure from the Andong Kim clan, who held a number of high-ranking government positions in the late Joseon period, including Chief State Councillor at King Cheoljong's court. He was the younger brother of Queen Sunwon.

Biography 
Kim Jwa-geun was born in 1797, as a member of the Andong Kim clan (신 안동 김씨; 新 安東 金氏). His father was Kim Jo-sun and his mother was Lady Shim of Cheongsong. He was the fourth of seven children.

In 1802, his older sister became the Queen of Joseon at the age of 13, when she married King Sunjo during his second year of reign.

In 1825, at the recommendation of his father, he served as a vice-deputy of Mupomgwanik, and in 1834 was promoted to the position of Cheomjong. In the second year of King Cheoljong's reign, he was appointed to several important positions.

On February 25, 1853, he was appointed as Chief State Councillor, and though he attempted to resign, he was not allowed to until April 19, 1862. However, in September 1863, he was ordered to "return as chief minister".

In 1862, he served as governor while Lee Jeong-cheong was trying to quell the civil war which was arising from the disturbance of Samjeong.

Until her death, on September 21, 1857, his older sister, Queen Sunwon, who has served as Queen Regent two times, had given immense political influence to the Andong Kim clan, which was the central figure in politics up until 1863–1864, when Heungseon Daewongun, with the help of Queen Sinjeong, stepped in during the regency of his son, King Gojong. When Gojong became King and Heungseon Daewongun came to power, Kim Jwa-geun withdrew from the position of Chief State Councillor, but continued to participate in government affairs. Together with his adoptive son, Kim Byeon-gi, he helped Heungseon Daewongun in his regency, since he had difficulty in maintaining the affairs of the state as he came from a distant royal line.

When he died in 1869, he was given the posthumous title of Chungik (Hangul: 충익; Hanja: 忠翼).

In 1990, the descendants of his adopted son donated the house where Kim Jwa-geun and his family had lived to the Seoul National University.

Family 
 Great-great-great-great-great-great-great-great-grandfather
 Kim Saeng-hae (김생해, 金生海)
 Great-great-great-great-great-great-great-grandfather
 Kim Geuk-hyo (김극효, 金克孝) (16 September 1542 – 3 February 1618)
 Great-great-great-great-great-great-great-grandmother
 Lady Jeong of the Dongnae Jeong clan (동래 정씨)
 Great-great-great-great-great-great-grandfather
 Kim Sang-gwan (김상관, 金尙觀) (9 January 1556 – 12 May 1621)
 Great-great-great-great-great-grandfather
 Kim Gwang-chan (김광찬, 金光燦) (1597 – 24 February 1668)
 Great-great-great-great-great-grandmother
 Lady Kim of the Yeonan Kim clan (연안 김씨)
 Great-great-great-great-grandfather
 Kim Su-hang (김수항, 金壽恒) (1629 – 9 April 1689)
 Great-great-great-great-grandmother
 Lady Na of the Anjeong Na clan (안정 나씨)
 Great-great-great-grandfather
 Kim Chang-jib (김창집, 金昌集) (1648 – 2 May 1722)
 Great-great-great-grandmother
 Lady Park (박씨)
 Great-great-grandfather
 Kim Je-gyeom (김제겸, 金濟謙)
 Great-grandfather
 Kim Dal-haeng (김달행, 金達行)
 Grandfather
 Kim Yi-jung (김이중, 金履中); served as Prime Minister
 Grandmother
 Lady Shin of the Pyeongsan Shin clan (평산 신씨, 平山 申氏)
 Father
 Kim Jo-sun, Internal Prince Yeongan (김조순 영안부원군, 金祖淳 永安府院君) (1765–1832)
 Mother
 Internal Princess Consort Cheongyang of the Cheongsong Shim clan (청양부부인 심씨, 靑陽府夫人 沈氏) (1766–1828)
 Maternal grandfather: Shim Geon-ji (심건지, 沈健之)
 Maternal grandmother: Lady Yi of the Jeonju Yi clan (증 정경부인 전주 이씨); Sim Geon-ji’s second wife
 Siblings:
 Older brother: Kim Yoo-geun (김유근, 金逌根) (March 1785 – July 1840); became the adoptive son of Kim Yong-sun (김용순, 金龍淳)
 Adoptive nephew: Kim Byeon-ju (김병주, 金炳㴤); son of Kim Hong-geun (김홍근, 金弘根)
 Older brother: Kim Won-geun (김원근, 金元根) (1786–1832)
 Nephew: Kim Byeon-ji (김병지, 金炳地)
 Older sister: Queen Sunwon of the Andong Kim clan (순원왕후 김씨) (8 June 1789 – 21 September 1857)
 Brother-in-law: King Sunjo of Joseon (순조대왕, 純祖大王) (29 July 1790 – 13 December 1834)
 Nephew: Yi Yeong, Crown Prince Hyomyeong (효명세자, 孝明世子) (18 September 1809 – 25 June 1830)
 Niece: Princess Myeongon (명온공주) (1810–1832)
 Niece: Princess Bokon (복온공주) (24 November 1818 – 10 June 1832)
 Unnamed nephew (1820–1820)
 Niece: Princess Deokon (덕온공주) (1822–1844)
 Adoptive nephew: King Cheoljong of Joseon (25 July 1831 – 16 January 1864)
 Younger sister: Lady Kim of the Andong Kim clan
 Brother-in-law: Nam Gu-sun (남구순, 南久淳)
 Nephew: Nam Byeon-cheol (남병철, 南秉哲) (1817–1863)
 Niece: Lady Nam (남씨, 南氏)
 Nephew-in-law: Kim Byeon-gi (김병기, 金炳冀) (1818–1875); son of Kim Yeong-geun (김영근, 金泳根)
 Younger sister: Lady Kim of the Andong Kim clan
 Brother-in-law: Lee Gyeom-jae (이겸재, 李謙在)
 Younger sister: Lady Kim of the Andong Kim clan
 Brother-in-law: Lee Geung-woo (이긍우, 李肯愚)
 Wives and children: 
 Lady Yun (정경부인 윤씨, 貞敬夫人 尹氏)
 Adoptive son: Kim Byeon-gi (김병기, 金炳冀) (1818–1875); son of Kim Yeong-geun (김영근, 金泳根)
 Adoptive daughter-in-law: Lady Nam (남씨, 南氏); (남구순, 南久淳); daughter of his younger sister and Nam Gu-sun
 Adoptive grandson: Kim Yong-gyun (김용균, 金用均)
 Concubine: Nahab (나합), Lady Naju of the Yang clan (나주부인 양씨, 羅州夫人 梁氏)

In popular culture

Drama 
 Portrayed by Lee Sun-jae in the 1975 TBC TV series The King's First Love
 Portrayed by Jang Min-ho in the 1982 KBS1 TV series Wind and Cloud
 Portrayed by Kim Seong-won in the 1989 KBS2 TV series Wind, Clouds, and Rain
 Portrayed by Jeong Ok in the 1990 MBC TV series 500 Years of Joseon: Daewongun
 Portrayed by Song Jae-ho in the 2001 KBS TV series Empress Myeongseong
 Portrayed by Choi Jong-won in the 2014 KBS2 TV series Gunman in Joseon
 Portrayed by Cha Gwang-su in the 2020 TV Chosun TV series Kingmaker: The Change of Destiny
 Portrayed by Kim Tae-woo in the 2020 TVN TV series Mr. Queen

Film 
 Portrayed by Nam Gyeong-eup in the 2016 film The Map Against the World
 Portrayed by Park Yoon-sik in the 2018 film Fengshui

References

1797 births
1869 deaths
Joseon scholar-officials
18th-century Korean people
19th-century Korean people
Andong Kim clan